The Odessa File is a thriller by English writer Frederick Forsyth, first published in 1972, about the adventures of a young German reporter attempting to discover the location of a former SS concentration-camp commander.

The name ODESSA is an acronym for the German phrase "Organisation der ehemaligen SS-Angehörigen", which translates as "Organisation of Former Members of the SS". The novel alleges that ODESSA was an international Nazi organisation established before the defeat of Nazi Germany for the purpose of protecting former members of the SS after the war.

Plot
In November 1963, shortly after the assassination of John F. Kennedy, Peter Miller, a German freelance crime reporter, follows an ambulance to the apartment of Salomon Tauber, a Holocaust survivor who has committed suicide. The next day, Miller is given the dead man's diary by a friend in the Hamburger Polizei. After reading Tauber's life story and learning that Tauber had been in the Riga Ghetto commanded by Eduard Roschmann, "The Butcher of Riga", Miller resolves to search for Roschmann whom Tauber recognised a few days earlier, alive and prosperous, in Hamburg. Miller's attention is especially drawn to one diary passage in which Tauber describes having seen Roschmann shoot a German Army captain who was wearing a distinctive military decoration.

Miller pursues the story and visits the State Attorney General's office and other offices where he learns that no one is prepared to search for or prosecute former Nazis. But his investigations take him to famed war criminal investigator Simon Wiesenthal, who tells him about "ODESSA".

Miller is approached by a group of Jewish vigilantes with ties to the Mossad, who have vowed to search for German war criminals and kill them and have been attempting to infiltrate ODESSA. At their request, Miller agrees to infiltrate ODESSA himself and is trained to pass for a former Waffen-SS sergeant by a repentant ex-member of the SS. Miller visits a lawyer working for ODESSA and after passing severe scrutiny is sent to meet a passport forger who supplies those members who wish to escape.

Slowly Miller unravels the entire system, but his cover is compromised, in part by his insistence on using his own distinctive sports car, which is associated with the journalist Miller, not the SS man he is impersonating, and ODESSA sets its top hitman on Miller's trail. Miller escapes one trap by sheer luck: the hitman later installs a bomb in Miller's car, but the car's stiff suspension prevents it from going off.

Eventually Miller confronts Roschmann at gunpoint and forces him to read from Tauber's diary. Roschmann attempts to justify his actions to his "fellow Aryan", but is taken aback when Miller says he has not tracked down Roschmann for being a mass murderer of Jews. Rather, Miller directs him to the passage describing Roschmann's murder of the army captain, who Miller reveals to have been his father Erwin. All of Roschmann's arrogance and bravado deserts him, and he is reduced to begging for his life. Instead of killing him, however, Miller handcuffs Roschmann to the fireplace and says he plans to have him arrested and prosecuted.

Miller is caught off guard when Roschmann's bodyguard returns to the house, disarms him and knocks him unconscious. The bodyguard drives to the village in Miller's car to telephone for help, but is killed when he drives over a snow-covered pole, an impact hard enough to trigger the bomb. Roschmann manages to escape, eventually flying to Argentina. The hitman who has been sent to kill Miller is instead killed by an Israeli agent Josef.

While Miller is recovering in hospital, he is told what happened while he was unconscious. Josef warns him not to tell anyone the story. He does disclose that with Roschmann (code-named "Vulkan") in Argentina, West German authorities (at the urging of the Israelis) will shut down his industrial facility that was producing missile guidance systems for the Egyptian Army. ODESSA's plan throughout the novel – to obliterate the State of Israel by combining German technological know-how with Egyptian biological weapons – has been thwarted. In addition, Miller's information reaches the public and badly embarrasses the West German authorities enough for them to arrest and prosecute a large number of ODESSA members, though the book notes that ODESSA continues to exist and usually succeeds in keeping former SS members from facing justice.

Josef – in reality Major Uri Ben-Shaul, an Israeli Army officer – returns to Israel to be debriefed, and performs one final duty. He has taken Tauber's diary with him and per the last request in the diary, Uri visits Yad Vashem and says Kaddish for the soul of Salomon Tauber.

Film adaptation and SS Captain Eduard Roschmann

The film adaptation The Odessa File was released in 1974 starring Jon Voight and Maximilian Schell. It was directed by Ronald Neame with a score by Andrew Lloyd Webber. It is based rather loosely on the book, but it brought about the exposure of the real-life "Butcher of Riga", Eduard Roschmann. After the film was released to the public, he was arrested by the Argentinian police, skipped bail, and fled to Asunción, Paraguay, where he died on 10 August 1977.

Real life SS members in the novel
In The Odessa File the head of ODESSA is given as SS General Richard Glücks, who is determined to destroy the State of Israel nearly two decades after the end of World War II, while the head of ODESSA in Germany is a former SS Officer called the "Werwolf", who is implied to be SS General Hans-Adolf Prützmann. (If the real Glücks had still been alive, he would have been 74 years old and Prützmann would have been 62 in 1963. The part of Glücks in the 1974 movie was played by Hannes Messemer).

External links

1972 British novels
British novels adapted into films
British thriller novels
Novels by Frederick Forsyth
Novels set in Germany
Novels about journalists
Fiction set in 1963
Hutchinson (publisher) books
Fictional Mossad agents
Novels about Nazi hunters